Saint-Jacut-du-Mené is a former commune in the Côtes-d'Armor département of Brittany in northwestern France. On 1 January 2016, it was merged into the new commune Le Mené.

Saint-Jacut-du-Mené is located in Central Brittany, equal distance from Saint-Brieuc, Rennes and Dinan. Its name comes from a 6th-century Saint called Jacut and the Breton word menez meaning "mount". The main employer is Kermené, subsidiary of E.Leclerc which specializes in meatworks.

Population
Inhabitants of Saint-Jacut-du-Mené are called Jagüins in French. In 2011, the town had 728 inhabitants.

See also
Communes of the Côtes-d'Armor department

References

External links

Former communes of Côtes-d'Armor